Jidi is a village in the municipality of Gəgiran in the Lankaran Rayon of Azerbaijan.

See also
 Judeo-Persian

References

Populated places in Lankaran District